Thomas Prestwood (by 1500–58), of Exeter, Devon, was an English Member of Parliament.

He was Mayor of Exeter 1544-5 and 1550–1.

Prestwood became Member (MP) of the Parliament of England for Exeter in 1547.

References

15th-century births
1558 deaths
Mayors of Exeter
English MPs 1547–1552
Members of the Parliament of England (pre-1707) for Exeter